Cola cecidiifolia is a species of flowering plant in the Family Malvaceae. It is found only in Cameroon. Its natural habitat is subtropical or tropical moist lowland forests. It is threatened by habitat loss.

References

cecidiifolia
Endemic flora of Cameroon
Critically endangered flora of Africa
Taxonomy articles created by Polbot
Taxa named by Martin Cheek